= Mbambe Forest Reserve =

Forest reserve in Cameroon

The Mbambe Forest Reserve is found in Cameroon, and is Government-managed. The reported area covers 285.75 km^{2}.
